Oopeltidae is a family of air-breathing land slugs, terrestrial pulmonate gastropod mollusks in the superfamily Arionoidea (according to the taxonomy of the Gastropoda by Bouchet & Rocroi, 2005).

Subfamilies and genera 
The family Oopeltidae consists of two subfamilies:
 Oopeltinae Cockerell, 1891
 Ariopeltinae Sirgel, 1985

Genera in the family Oopeltidae include:

Oopeltinae
 Oopelta Mörch [in Heynemann], 1867 - type genus of the family Oopeltidae
 Oopelta nigropunctata

Ariopeltinae
 Ariopelta Sirgel, 1985 - type genus of the subfamily Ariopeltinae
 Ariopelta capensis Krauss, 1848 - type species, synonym: Limax (Limas) capensis Krauss, 1848
 Ariopelta variegata Sirgel, 2012
 Ariostralis
 Ariostralis nebulosa

Distribution 
Two genera of Ariopeltinae live in South Africa. Ariopelta capensis and Ariostralis nebulosa are relict primitive species in the Cape Fold Mountains. In the Landdroskop area there are melanistic populations of these slugs.

References

External links 

Endemic fauna of South Africa
 
Taxa named by Theodore Dru Alison Cockerell
Gastropod genera